Coconut Hero is a German-Canadian comedy film directed by Florian Cossen and released in 2015. Coconut Hero premiered on March 18, 2015 at the Carlton Cinema in Toronto where it screened for two consecutive weeks. Following its premiere, on March 25, Coconut Hero was shown for one week in Ottawa's ByTowne Cinema.

Plot 
Coconut Hero follows the story of Mike Tyson (not to be confused with Mike Tyson); a 16 year old student living in the Canadian town of Faintville. The film begins with Mike trying, and failing, to commit suicide.  After surviving his suicide attempt, Mike soon finds out that he has a deadly tumor. Initially, the tumor appears as a godsend in Mike's mind as he becomes increasingly preoccupied with the desire and development of a mission to find a way to end his life. This mission is reinforced by his religious figure's encouragement for Mike to find a plan for himself and follow through with it.

After finding out about his tumor, Mike meets Miranda and his priorities in life change from his morbid preoccupation, to spending time with and learning about his new love interest. Soon after, Mike also meets his father; a figure that had been absent in his life until this point in time. Cynthia, his mother, objects to his father's sudden return, but becomes closer to him after learning that Mike has planned against getting surgery to remove his tumor: the only means of saving his life.

Mike becomes overwhelmed with the conflict between choosing to fulfill his wishes of ending his life versus his thoughts and feelings surrounding his new relationship with Miranda. These feelings lead Mike into making a spontaneous decision to run away with Miranda on a road-trip. After witnessing Miranda being struck by a car and suffering an unfortunate death whilst still on their trip together, Mike decides to get the surgery that will remove his tumor. Ultimately, Mike chooses life.

Cast

Production 
The director, Florian Cossen, is a German-Canadian and pays homage to a large portion of his youth spent in a small Canadian city by filming Coconut Hero within Canada in a similarly small town. Coconut Hero was filmed in 2014 in Sault Ste. Marie, Ontario, a town in northern Ontario. The filming of Coconut Hero also took the cast to Germany for two days, after spending six weeks in Sault Ste. Marie.

The film is a German-Canadian co-production from Toronto's Six Island Productions and Germany-based UFA Fiction.  Search Engine Films out of Toronto distributed the movie out of Canada.

Reception 
Barry Hertz of The Globe and Mail praises Florian Cossen's ability to cast an impressive number of European actors for a small film, but describes the film's plot by saying "there's nothing new here that hasn't been mined, ahem, to death in other, similar genre entries".

Harald Mühlbeyer, a German critic from the 2015 Munich Film Festival, explains that the title is confusing and generally unrelated to the content of the film itself, but is quoted as saying that overall, Coconut Hero is a good film: "[The title] is the only mistake in this outstanding one masterpiece", as translated from German.

Award nominations 
In 2015, Coconut Hero was nominated for the Golden Eye Award at the Zurich Film Festival. The film was later nominated in the New Directors Competition Category in 2016 at the Seattle International Film Festival.

References

External links 

2015 comedy films
Canadian comedy films
German comedy films
English-language Canadian films
English-language German films
2010s Canadian films
2010s German films